Michael Perkins may refer to:
 Michael J. Perkins (1899–1918), US Army soldier
 Michael Perkins (poet) (born 1942), American poet
 M Ross Perkins (born 1987), American songwriter